The Haig was a jazz club located at 638 South Kenmore Avenue in Hollywood. Along with the Tiffany Club it was one of Los Angeles's premier jazz venues in the 1950s and strongly associated with West Coast jazz.

History
Author James Lincoln Collier describes the club as "the best-known Los Angeles jazz club of the day". Located across from the Ambassador Hotel, which housed the famous supper club, The Cocoanut Grove. The Haig club was originally a bungalow home, which was then converted by owner John Bennett into a club. It has been described as looking more like a doll house than a club. In early 1952 Gerry Mulligan  walked into the club and found Erroll Garner, Bobby Short and others jamming without amplification. He joined in on an informal Monday night jam. He would later take over the jam night. Mulligan would audition and work with artists such as Chet Baker, Chico Hamilton and Bob Whitlock and many others.

In its time, Erroll Garner, Shorty Rogers, Red Norvo, Laurindo Almeida, Ornette Coleman and Bud Shank all played the club. Gerry Mulligan's first California band was formed at The Haig and maintained an eleven-month engagement there beginning in the spring of 1952. This edition of the Gerry Mulligan quartet would help to bring trumpeter Chet Baker to prominence. In its short life the pianoless quartet released several records for Richard Bock's Pacific label.

Live recordings
Harry Edison - Sweets at the Haig (Pacific 4)
Gerry Mulligan - Gerry Mulligan Quartet with Lee Konitz (Pacific 2)
Gerry Mulligan - Lee Konitz and the Gerry Mulligan Quartet (Pacific 10)
Chet Baker and Stan Getz - West Coast Live (Pacific Jazz, 1953 [1997])

See also 
 List of jazz clubs
 West Coast jazz

Notes

References

Sources

Length	496 pages

Jazz clubs in Los Angeles
Defunct jazz clubs in California